The Good Life is a 2007 film written and directed by Stephen Berra, starring Mark Webber, Zooey Deschanel, Patrick Fugit, Bill Paxton, Drea de Matteo, Harry Dean Stanton, and Chris Klein.

Plot
A movie about the travails of Jason (Mark Webber), a young gas station attendant and movie projectionist living in Nebraska. His encounters with various social difficulties and with Frances (Zooey Deschanel), a beautiful and enigmatic young woman leads to dramatic changes and decisions in his life.

Cast
 Mark Webber as Jason Prayer
 Zooey Deschanel as Frances
 Harry Dean Stanton as Gus
 Bill Paxton as Robbie
 Chris Klein as Tad Tokas
 Patrick Fugit as Andrew
 Drea de Matteo as Dana
 Bruce McGill as Frank Jones
 Donal Logue as Daryll

Production
The Good Life was shot primarily in Canada in March 2006 on a budget of over 3 million dollars. The film was released January 20, 2007.

References

External links 
 
 
 The Good Life at Film Intuition: Review Database

2007 films
2007 drama films
2007 directorial debut films
Films scored by Don Davis (composer)
Films directed by Steve Berra
Films set in Nebraska
Films shot in Winnipeg
2000s English-language films